Aldo Grimaldi (1942 – 5 August 1990) was an Italian director and screenwriter.

Born in Catania, the son of the director and screenwriter Giovanni Grimaldi, he started his career as an assistant director in the films of his father. He made his directorial debut in 1967 with the "musicarello" Nel sole, and then he became a specialist of the genre, often working with the couple formed by Al Bano and Romina Power. He also directed a number of commedie sexy all'italiana. He died of an incurable disease at 48.

Filmography

As director

As writer

As assistant director

References

External links 
 

1942 births
1990 deaths
Italian film directors
20th-century Italian screenwriters
Italian male screenwriters
Film people from Catania
20th-century Italian male writers